The Mahindra Marazzo is a compact MPV designed and manufactured by the Indian automobile manufacturer Mahindra & Mahindra. Initially launched in 2018, the MPV was upgraded to a BS 6 compliant model with 3 variants in August 2020. 

The Marazzo was exhibited at the 2019 North American International Auto Show alongside the Roxor.

Design
 
The Marazzo was designed and developed by Mahindra's Design Studio, partnering with Pininfarina, Mahindra Research Valley, Chennai and Mahindra Automotive North America, Troy, Michigan in the initial stages and product engineering. The initial project code name was U321. The Marazzo was launched on September 3, 2018 and it is available either a 7-seater with captain seats in the middle row or an 8-seater. The climate control for the rear passengers is mounted on the center roof with a diffuse throw option for reduced noise.

Chassis 
The Marazzo is built on a heavyweight (1650kg), high and rigid ladder frame chassis containing a 52% of high strength steel with a transversely-mounted front-wheel-drivetrain, the world's first such arrangement. Mahindra has opted for this arrangement to eliminate the floor hump in the center and the propeller shaft to reduce weight.

Engine
Only manual transmission is being offered. A petrol version, along with an automatic transmission were expected to be launched in 2022-23.

Safety 
Marazzo received a four star rating for adult occupants and 2 stars for infants from the Global NCAP in 2018 (similar to Latin NCAP 2013).

References

External links
 

Marazzo
Compact MPVs
Global NCAP small MPVs
Cars introduced in 2018